Bertrand Gbongou Liango (born April 2, 1982) is a Central African taekwondo athlete.

He was the 2003 African featherweight champion and competed in the men's 68 kg class at the 2004 Summer Olympics. However, Liango was knocked unconscious during his first round match against Tuncay Caliskan of Austria. Following mouth-to-mouth resuscitation, he was taken to hospital and diagnosed with a concussion. He had been leading 4-1.

External links
 

1982 births
Living people
Central African Republic male taekwondo practitioners
Taekwondo practitioners at the 2004 Summer Olympics
Olympic taekwondo practitioners of the Central African Republic
African Games medalists in taekwondo
African Games gold medalists for the Central African Republic
Competitors at the 2003 All-Africa Games